John H. Myers (born July 2, 1945) is an American businessman.

Education and early life
Myers was raised in Richmond Hill, Queens by Jack & Edna (née Stroudhoff) Myers. He is also the brother of David Myers. He graduated from Wagner College with a bachelor's degree in Mathematics in 1967. He then attended and graduated from Navy OCS, and served two tours in South Vietnam.

Career
He is the former president and chief executive officer of General Electric Asset Managements, and the current chairman at ForstmannLeff, a buyout firm, "Mr. Myers joins ForstmannLeff after retiring in July as President and chief executive officer of GE Asset Management, a position he held since 1987. In that role, he led the firm's transformation from GE's corporate pension office into a leader in third-party institutional asset management that grew from $50 billion to $200 billion in assets, including a significant amount of external capital.

Mr. Myers served in several leadership capacities during his 37-year tenure with GE." At GE, he had previously been a backer of that company. He is on the board of directors for Hilton Hotels Corp. "In addition to serving as a Director of Hilton, Myers is a member of the boards of directors of GE Capital, Pebble Beach Company, and Warburg Pincus Advisory Board. He also is a trustee of Wagner College and serves on the pension managers advisory committee of the New York Stock Exchange."

References

1945 births
Living people
General Electric people
United States Navy personnel of the Vietnam War
American financial businesspeople
United States Navy officers
People from Richmond Hill, Queens